Fajar LRT station is an elevated Light Rail Transit (LRT) station on the Bukit Panjang LRT line in Bukit Panjang, Singapore, along Fajar Road. It serves the residents of public housing HDB flats located along the northern part of Bukit Panjang Ring Road. The station is right next to Fajar Shopping Centre and near the Chi Hock Keng (Buddhist) Temple.

Etymology
This station is located along Fajar Road. Fajar means "dawn" in Malay.

History

Before the construction of Fajar Station, residents of this part of Bukit Panjang were served by a bus service that called on the bus stop just next to the Fajar Station, namely the TIBS (predecessor to SMRT Buses) Service 179. This bus brought passengers around Bukit Panjang and towards the Choa Chu Kang MRT/LRT station where they could transfer easily to the train system mentioned.

TIBS Service 179 was withdrawn on 26 December 1999 as part of the BPLRT rationalization. Today, two other daily bus services continues to run along Fajar LRT Station, they are service 922, a feeder service that serves (aside from Fajar) parts of the estate such as Senja, Jelapang, Segar and Bangkit, and 972/972M, a loop service that heads south to the city-centre before looping close to Dhoby Ghaut MRT station, specifically where the YMCA Building is located. Both bus services begins and ends at Bukit Panjang Bus Interchange.

Incidents
A man was found dead on the LRT tracks at Fajar station at about 1 a.m. on 24 March 2017. In an emailed statement, SMRT said it was alerted that a body was spotted on the tracks at the station after the last train in service left the platform. He was the third person to be killed along the Bukit Panjang LRT line since the line commenced operations in 1999.

References

External links

Railway stations in Singapore opened in 1999
Bukit Panjang
LRT stations of Bukit Panjang LRT Line
Light Rail Transit (Singapore) stations